KPEL (1420 kHz, "103.3 The Goat") is an AM radio station licensed to serve Lafayette, Louisiana. The station is owned by Townsquare Media and licensed to Townsquare Media of Lafayette, LLC. It airs a sports radio format featuring programming from ESPN Radio and Fox Sports Radio. Its studios are located on Bertrand Road in Lafayette, and its transmitter is located about two miles north of the studios.

The station was assigned the KPEL call letters by the Federal Communications Commission on July 1, 1957.

The station is the base of the Great S.C.O.T.T. Show with Scott Prather. The station serves as the flagship station of Louisiana Ragin' Cajun Athletics, airing UL football, men's and women's basketball, baseball, and softball games.

On September 30, 2022, KPEL rebranded as "103.3 The Goat".

References

External links
KPEL official website

PEL
ESPN Radio stations
Lafayette Parish, Louisiana
Radio stations established in 1961
1961 establishments in Louisiana
Townsquare Media radio stations
Sports radio stations in the United States